Phú Hòa is a township of Thoại Sơn District in An Giang Province, Vietnam.

References

Communes of An Giang province
Populated places in An Giang province
Townships in Vietnam